Torre Alháquime is a village located in the province of Cádiz, southern Spain. It is home to a Moorish castle and cemetery (13th-14th centuries).

References

External links

Torre Alháquime - Sistema de Información Multiterritorial de Andalucía

Municipalities of the Province of Cádiz